Scott Cunningham is a professor of economics at Baylor University, Research Fellow of the Baylor Collaborative on Hunger and Poverty, and Research Affiliate of the Computational Justice Lab. He is known for popularizing advances in non-experimental impact evaluation methods (causal inference) by making it more accessible to practitioners. He wrote the Yale University Press textbook Causal Inference: The Mixtape. He is the organizer of a 5k running race at the annual meetings of the American Economic Association.

He holds a B.A. in Literature from the University of Tennessee and a PhD in Economics from the University of Georgia.

Research 
Cunningham's research examines prostitution markets, foster care, abortion, mental health, and drug policy. 
 
He has found that the accidental legalization of prostitution in Rhode Island between 2003 and 2009 increased the size of that market, but reduced sexual violence against women and the incidence of sexually transmitted diseases. He has also found the sudden closure of abortion clinics in Texas in 2013 resulted in a decline in the number of abortions linked to an increase in distances to open clinics.

Selected works 

 Cunningham, Scott. Causal Inference: The Mixtape. Yale University Press, 2021.
 Cunningham, Scott, and Todd D. Kendall. "Prostitution 2.0: The changing face of sex work." Journal of Urban Economics 69, no. 3 (2011): 273-287.
 Cunningham, Scott, and Manisha Shah. "Decriminalizing indoor prostitution: Implications for sexual violence and public health." The Review of Economic Studies 85, no. 3 (2018): 1683-1715.
 Cunningham, Scott, Benjamin Engelstätter, and Michael R. Ward. "Violent video games and violent crime." Southern Economic Journal 82, no. 4 (2016): 1247-1265.
 Cunningham, Scott, and Keith Finlay. "Parental substance use and foster care: Evidence from two methamphetamine supply shocks." Economic Inquiry 51, no. 1 (2013): 764-782.
 Lindo, Jason M., Caitlin Knowles Myers, Andrea Schlosser, and Scott Cunningham. "How far is too far? New evidence on abortion clinic closures, access, and abortions." Journal of Human resources 55, no. 4 (2020): 1137-1160.

References 

21st-century American economists
Baylor University faculty
University of Tennessee alumni
University of Georgia alumni
Living people
Labor economists
Year of birth missing (living people)